Senator Daley may refer to:

John P. Daley (born 1946), Illinois State Senate
Kevin Daley (politician) (born 1957), Michigan State Senate
Richard J. Daley (1902–1976), Illinois State Senate
Richard M. Daley (born 1942), Illinois State Senate
Ted Daley (born 1966), Minnesota State Senate

See also
John Dailey (politician) (1867–1929), Illinois State Senate
Senator Daly (disambiguation)